This is a List of Privy Counsellors of the United Kingdom appointed during the reign of King Edward VII, from 1901 to 1910.

Edward VII

1901
William Maclagan (1826–1910)
Lewis Fry (1832–1921)
Frederick Halsey (1839–1927)
Edmund Barton (1849–1920)
Sir Samuel Griffith (1845–1920)
Sir Francis Plunkett (1835–1907)
Sir Mortimer Durand (1850–1924)
Sir Dighton Probyn (1833–1924)
The Earl Roberts (1832–1914)
The Lord Wenlock (1849–1912)
Sir Spencer Ponsonby-Fane (1824–1915)
Arthur Winnington-Ingram (1858–1946)
The Marquess of Cholmondeley (1858–1923)
The Lord Chesham (1850–1907)
The Lord Milner (1854–1925)
Sir James Mathew (1830–1908)
Sir Herbert Cozens-Hardy (1838–1920)
The Duke of Buccleuch (1831–1914)
Sir Henry Aubrey-Fletcher, Bt (1835–1910)
Sir Andrew Scoble (1831–1916)

1902
Sir Arthur Wilson (1837–1915)
Sir John Day (1826–1908)
Sir John Bonser (1847–1914)
The Earl of Leven (1835–1906)
The Earl of Dudley (1867–1932)
The Earl of Minto (1845–1914)
The Lord Rothschild (1840–1915)
The Lord Kelvin (1824–1907)
The Lord Lister (1827–1912)
Sir Michael Herbert (1857–1903)
George Wyndham (1863–1913)
Sir Edward Grey, Bt (1862–1933)
Sir John Dorington, Bt (1832–1911)
Sir Hugh Guion MacDonnell (1831–1904)
Sir Antony MacDonnell (1844–1925)
Sir Alfred Lyall (1835–1911)
Sir Albert Hime (1842–1919)
Sir Robert Bond (1857–1927)
Sir Ernest Cassel (1852–1921)
Richard Haldane (1856–1928)
Arthur Jeffreys (1848–1906)
James Round (1842–1916)
Austen Chamberlain (1863–1937)
Sir Richard Cartwright (1835–1912)
The Lord Revelstoke (1863–1929)
Sir Joseph Dimsdale, Bt (1849–1912)
George Finch (1835–1907)
Henry Hobhouse (1854–1937)
Sir Savile Crossley, Bt (1857–1935)

1903
Randall Davidson (1848–1930)
Hon. Sir Francis Bertie (1844–1919)
The Earl of Onslow (1853–1911)
Sir Arthur Charles (1839–1921)
Sir Ralph Henry Knox (1836–1913)
Lord Stanley (1865–1948)
Hon. Alfred Lyttelton (1857–1913)
H. O. Arnold-Forster (1855–1909)
The Marquess of Salisbury (1861–1947)
Charles Dickson (1850–1922)

1904
Sir Edwin Egerton (1841–1916)
Hon. Charles Hardinge (1858–1944)
Sir Henri-Elzéar Taschereau (1836–1911)
Sir Gainsford Bruce (1834–1912)
Charles Booth (1840–1916)
William Kenyon-Slaney (1847–1908)
James Parker Smith (1854–1929)
Sir Alexander Fuller-Acland-Hood, Bt (1853–1917)

1905
Sir Gorell Barnes (1848–1913)
The Earl Cawdor (1847–1911)
Hon. Ailwyn Fellowes (1855–1924)
Sir Arthur Nicolson, Bt. (1849–1928)
Sir Edward Goschen (1847–1924)
The Earl of Mansfield (1860–1906)
The Lord Rayleigh (1842–1919)
The Lord Tennyson (1852–1928)
Sir Robert Finlay (1842–1929)
Arthur Cohen (1830–1914)
Sir Frederick Darley (1830–1910)
John Atkinson (1844–1932)
Edward Carson (1854–1935)
Sir Alfred Wills (1828–1912)
John Sandars (1853–1934)
Victor Cavendish (1868–1938)
Sir Charles Dalrymple, Bt (1839–1916)
Amelius Lockwood (1847–1928)
Sir Robert Reid (1846–1923)
John Sinclair (1860–1925)
David Lloyd George (1863–1945)
John Burns (1858–1943)
Augustine Birrell (1850–1933)
Sydney Buxton (1853–1934)
Lewis Harcourt (1863–1922)

1906
The Earl of Liverpool (1846–1907)
The Earl of Sefton (1871–1930)
The Earl Beauchamp (1872–1938)
Richard Causton (1843–1929)
Thomas Shaw (1850–1937)
Thomas Burt (1837–1922)
Sir Walter Foster (1840–1913)
John Ellis (1841–1910)
The Duke of Manchester (1877–1947)
The Lord Reay (1839–1921)
Edmund Robertson (1845–1911)
Henry Labouchère (1831–1912)
Sir John Moulton (1844–1921)
Sir Maurice de Bunsen (1852–1932)
Sir George Farwell (1845–1915)
Sir John Brunner, Bt (1842–1919)
Sir James Kitson, Bt (1835–1911)
Sir Francis Mowatt (1837–1919)
Sir Cecil Clementi Smith (1840–1916)
Robert Farquharson (1836–1918)
George William Palmer (1851–1913)
Sir Ernest Satow (1843–1929)
Sir Henry Buckley (1845–1935)
Sir Arthur Kekewich (1832–1907)
Sir Claude Macdonald (1852–1915)

1907
The Lord Sandhurst (1855–1921)
Reginald McKenna (1863–1943)
The Lord Allendale (1860–1923)
Sir William Rann Kennedy (1846–1915)
Winston Churchill (1874–1965)
Sir Joseph Ward (1856–1930)
Sir Leander Starr Jameson (1853–1917)
Sir Frederick Moor (1853–1927)
Louis Botha (1862–1919)
Sir William Gurdon (1840–1911)
Eugene Wason (1846–1927)
Robert Spence Watson (1837–1911)
The Lord Denman (1874–1954)
The Earl of Granard (1874–1948)
The Lord Farquhar (1844–1923)
George Whiteley (1855–1925)
William McEwan (1827–1913)
Charles Stuart Parker (1829–1910)
George W. E. Russell (1853–1919)
Sir Charles Tupper, Bt (1821–1915)

1908
The Lord FitzMaurice (1846–1935)
Walter Runciman (1870–1949)
Thomas Buchanan (1846–1911)
Thomas Lough (1850–1922)
Sir Gerard Lowther (1858–1916)
Alfred Emmott (1858–1926)
Sir Thomas Whittaker (1850–1919)
Charles Milnes Gaskell (1842–1919)
Sir Edward Hamilton (1847–1908)
Sir John Edge (1841–1926)
Sir Charles Fitzpatrick (1851–1942)
The Earl Grey (1851–1917)
Sir Fairfax Cartwright (1857–1928)
Sir Rennell Rodd (1858–1941)
Jack Pease (1860–1943)
Herbert Samuel (1870–1963)
Sir Charles McLaren, Bt (1850–1934)
Sir Edward Clarke (1841–1931)

1909
Cosmo Lang (1864–1945)
The Lord Northcote (1846–1911)
Sir John Bigham (1840–1929)
Alexander Ure (1853–1928)
Charles Hobhouse (1862–1941)
Russell Rea (1846–1916)
John X. Merriman (1841–1926)
Sir Hudson Kearley, Bt (1856–1934)
James Stuart (1843–1913)
Hon. Sir Walter Hely-Hutchinson (1849–1913)
Sir Edward Seymour (1840–1929)
Sir Edgar Speyer, Bt (1862–1932) Struck off 1921
Sir Henry Roscoe (1833–1915)
J. E. B. Seely (1868–1947)
James Tomkinson (1840–1910)
Syed Ameer Ali (1849–1928)

1910
Hon. Ivor Guest (1873–1939)

References

1901